Hádegismóar Temple is a planned Buddhist temple, scheduled to be built in Reykjavík, Iceland. It will be funded by foreign sponsors and eventually house the Buddhist Association of Iceland, the country's largest Buddhist group. The temple will be located by Lake Rauðavatn in suburban Reykjavík and will consist of a stupa and two other structures. When completed, it will be the northernmost Buddhist temple in the world, only about 4 kilometres further north than its counterpart in Fredrika, Sweden.

See also 
 Buddhism in Iceland

References 

Asian diaspora in Europe
Buddhism in Iceland
Buddhist temples in Europe
Religious buildings and structures in Iceland
Proposed buildings and structures in Iceland
Proposed religious places
Thai Theravada Buddhist temples and monasteries
Thai diaspora in Europe
Religious organizations based in Iceland